Loyalsock may refer to the following places:

Loyalsock Creek, a tributary of the West Branch Susquehanna River in Pennsylvania
Loyalsock Trail, a hiking trail along Loyalsock Creek
Loyalsock State Forest, a Pennsylvania State Forest
Loyalsock Township, Lycoming County, Pennsylvania

See also